Czech Republic–Denmark relations are the current and historical relations between Czech Republic and Denmark. Czech Republic has an embassy in Copenhagen. Denmark has an embassy in Prague. Diplomatic relations were established on 1 January 1993. Relations between the Czech Republic and Denmark are described as "good". Both countries are full members of NATO and of the European Union.

Relations with Czechoslovakia
Diplomatic relations were established on 21 June 1929. A cultural and scientific cooperation was signed in Prague in 1968. In the 1970s trade between both countries reached 400 million Czechoslovak korunas per year.

In 1946, after World War II, Copenhagen Airport celebrated a welcome to the first aircraft on the route from Prague to Copenhagen. The Czech flag hang on a pole in the airport.

Trade and Investment
Danish exports amounted 4 million DKK, and imports amounted 4 million DKK in 2009.

Danish investment in Czech Republic were 10 billion DKK. Danish companies have invested in the Czech Republic. The investments has strengthen the bilateral friendship between the Czech Republic and Denmark. Lego, A. P. Moller-Maersk Group and Bang & Olufsen are some of the Danish companies that have investments in Czech Republic.

High level visits
In 1994, Queen Margrethe II of Denmark visited Czech Republic, and in 2006 the Czech president Václav Klaus visited Copenhagen.

Tycho Brahe

Tycho Brahe was a Danish nobleman known for his accurate and comprehensive astronomical and planetary observations. Coming from Scania, then part of Denmark, now part of modern-day Sweden, Tycho was well known in his lifetime as an astronomer and alchemist. He died in Prague.

Recent investigations have suggested that Tycho did not die from urinary problems but instead from mercury poisoning—extremely toxic levels of it have been found in hairs from his moustache. The results were, however, not conclusive. Prague City Hall approved a request by Danish scientists to exhume the remains in February 2010, and a team of Czech and Danish scientists from Aarhus University arrived in November 2010, to take bone, hair and clothing samples for analysis.

See also
 Foreign relations of the Czech Republic 
 Foreign relations of Denmark

References

External links
 

 
Denmark
Bilateral relations of Denmark